The 2017 Australia Day Honours were announced on 26 January 2017 by the Governor General of Australia, Sir Peter Cosgrove.

The Australia Day Honours are the first of the two major annual honours lists, announced on Australia Day (26 January), with the other being the Queen's Birthday Honours which are announced on the second Monday in June.

Order of Australia

Companion of the Order of Australia (AC)

General Division

Officer of the Order of Australia (AO)

General Division

Military Division

Member of the Order of Australia (AM)

General Division

Notes:

Military Division

Medal of the Order of Australia (OAM)

General Division

Military Division

Meritorious Service

Public Service Medal (PSM)

Australian Police Medal (APM)

Australian Fire Service Medal (AFSM)

Ambulance Service Medal (ASM)

Emergency Services Medal (ESM)

Distinguished and Conspicuous Service

Distinguished Service Cross (DSC)

Distinguished Service Medal (DSM)

Commendation for Distinguished Service

Bar to the Conspicuous Service Cross (CSC & Bar)

Conspicuous Service Cross (CSC)

Bar to the Conspicuous Service Medal (CSM & Bar)

Conspicuous Service Medal (CSM)

References

External links
Australian Honours Lists, www.gg.gov.au
Australia Day 2017 Honours List, www.gg.gov.au
Media notes from www.gg.gov.au:
Medal (OAM) of the Order of Australia in the General Division (A-E)
Medal (OAM) of the Order of Australia in the General Division (F-L)
Medal (OAM) of the Order of Australia in the General Division (M-R)
Medal (OAM) of the Order of Australia in the General Division (S-Z)

2017 awards in Australia
Orders, decorations, and medals of Australia